The  Golden Triangle Special Economic Zone (Lao: ເຂດເສດຖະກິດພິເສດ ສາມຫຼ່ຽມທອງຄຳ, abbreviated GTSEZ) is located along the Mekong River in the Ton Pheung District of Bokeo Province in Laos. The zone has an area about 3,000 hectares and was created in 2007 by the Lao government together with the Chinese-owned Hong Kong-registered company Kings Romans Group with the hope of generating economic development.

The zone is dominated by the Kings Romans casino which attracts mostly Chinese visitors, and several hotels. It is part of a wider trend of casinos emerging in the Mekong region following the displacement of money laundering from Macao in 2014.

Since its commencement, it has gained a reputation of being a Chinese city rife with illegal activities such as drug, human and animal trafficking although Kings Romans' owner has denied the allegations while Lao authorities have also carried out some enforcement action following the reports. In January 2018, the United States Treasury Department sanctioned Kings Romans, its owner, Zhao Wei, and the "Zhao Wei Transnational Crime Organization," alleging the casino was used to launder money and traffic drugs, among other serious crimes. Despite this, consignments of drugs and precursors still transit near the Golden Triangle Special Economic Zone. Seizures of high-grade crystal methamphetamine traced back to the Laos border are up over 200% in 2020 in northeast Thailand, and dozens of large seizures have been made in recent months in Vietnam along its remote and often mountainous 2,100 kilometer (1,300 mile) border with Laos as well. At the same time there are increasing reports of precursor chemicals from across the region going through Laos, destined for autonomous special regions and known drug-producing areas in neighbouring Myanmar. The SEZ is a known base for fraud factories, where global cyber scams are conducted.

Location

The Golden Triangle Special Economic Zone is located along the Mekong River in the infamous Golden Triangle area where Laos, Myanmar and Thailand meet. The zone is midway (20.361150, 100.099807) between Houay Xay, the capital of Laos' Bokeo Province, and Tachileik, Myanmar. The Thai village of Ban Sop Ruak near Chiang Saen town, Chiang Rai Province lies directly across the Mekong River from the zone.

Besides the casino, the zone has hotels, shops, restaurants, hospital and apartment blocks. There are also several markets in the zone, including the well-known Don Sao Market which is part of the itinerary of most Mekong River boat tours from Thailand.

Transportation

The Golden Triangle Special Economic Zone is linked by road to Houay Xay which lies about 55 km to the east. The road is part of Lao Route 3 which continues from Houay Xay to Luang Namtha and thereafter via Route 13 to the China-Laos border crossing at Boten, a further total distance of 230 km. Houay Xay is also connected to the Thai road network via the Fourth Thai-Lao Friendship Bridge between Houay Xai and Chiang Khong. Roads also run north of the zone and connects with other villages along the Mekong River in Bokeo Province.

In early October 2020, a $50 million investment to build a port in the Laotian town of Ban Mom, directly north of the Golden Triangle Special Economic Zone, was made by Osiano Trading Sole Co., a partner or front company of Zhao Wei and his organization. Zhao Wei is recognized as a significant organized crime figure by the United States Government for his involvement in the trafficking of drugs, wildlife and people, and other forms of serious transnational crime including large-scale money laundering including through the Kings Romans Casino and aligned businesses. The United Nations Office on Drugs and Crime (UNODC) has raised concerns several times about Laos being used by organized crime to traffic drugs, precursor chemicals and other illicit commodities, that unregulated border casinos in the Mekong region including Kings Romans are being used to launder money, and that the purchase of the Ban Mom port is a representation of organized crime infiltrating critical infrastructure in the region. The Ban Mom port has been confirmed as a location used for trafficking drugs and precursor chemicals into and out of drug production areas and special regions.

The zone can also be easily accessed from Thailand by boat from the pier at the Chiang Saen, Thailand-Laos Border Crossing Immigration Checkpoint at Ban Sop Ruak. Frequent passenger ferry boats operated by the Kings Romans Group run across the Mekong River between the checkpoint and the Sam Liam Kham Checkpoint in the zone. The boats operate between 6.00am and 8.00pm Thailand Standard Time and cost Thai baht 100 per trip, with the journey taking about 10 minutes.

The nearest airport to the zone is the Ban Huoeisay Airport in Houay Xay. However, the nearest international airport is the Chiang Rai Airport in Chiang Rai, which lies 60 km from Sop Ruak across the border in Thailand. The airport has direct flight connections with Chinese cities, thus allowing visitors, most of whom are Chinese nationals, a more direct access to the zone.

Economy

The zone was created with the intention to boost the economic situation in this remote corner of Laos. 

The website of the Lao Ministry of Planning and Investment's Investment Promotion Department states that the investment projects in the zone are in construction of economic infrastructures; agriculture, livestock, manufacturing; hotel and residential area development; golf courses; education institutions and health treatment centres; business and international trade; real estate; banking, insurance and financial institution; post, telecommunication, internet, advertising and printing; transportation of goods and passengers; development of tourism and entertainment zone; restaurants and bars and warehouses, duty-free shops and duty-free area. The website states that the total investment in the zone is estimated to be .

As gambling is illegal in China, and the zone is only a few hours journey by road or air from China, casinos including the Blue Shield Casino which was one of the first buildings in the zone, and hotels catering to a Chinese clientele have been built. Apartment blocks, houses and infrastructure facilities such as roads and piers have come up to cater to the influx of tourists and residents to the zone.

Controversies

The Golden Triangle Special Economic Zone has been labelled as a de facto Chinese colony, as the only currencies accepted are Chinese yuan and Thai baht. Shops in the zone are stocked mostly with Chinese products and Chinese food is offered in most of the restaurants and food outlets. 

Reports state that a robust industry involving trafficking in endangered animals has grown up around the Chinese tourist trade. Several restaurants in the SEZ serve 'exotic' meats: tiger, pangolin, bear cub, and python. Menus openly include such fare as bear paw, monitor lizards, geckos, and snakes and turtles. Tiger bone wine is a frequent accompaniment. Shops in the SEZ sell animal parts, stuffed animals, and ivory, all in contravention of the CITES treaty to which Laos is a party.

In January 2018, the US Treasury Department announced sanctions against what it called Zhao's transnational criminal organisation, naming two registered Hong Kong companies under the Kings Romans Group as its corporate fronts and identifying the group's owners Zhao Wei and his wife Su Guiqin as the organisation's leaders. The department said, "The Zhao Wei crime network engages in an array of horrendous illicit activities, including human trafficking and child prostitution, drug trafficking and wildlife trafficking."

Following the announcement, Zhao Wei called for a press conference, denying the allegations that illegal activities took place in the zone. Saying that the sanctions against his companies were groundless, he added that the Kings Romans Group's investment and development strictly complied with the law and signed agreements. "There are neither reasons nor motivations for us to run illegal businesses. On the contrary, we have cooperated with the government of Laos to prevent and combat strictly illegal acts," he said.

The Lao government has also taken some steps to curb the illegal trade in wildlife parts, confiscating items and closing shops during enforcement raids.

History

The area on which the Golden Triangle Special Economic Zone is now located was mostly rural agriculture land. The village of Ban Kwan was located in the area and its inhabitants had to be relocated to make way for the development of the zone. 

In 2007, Kings Romans Group entered into a 99-year lease for 10,000 hectares on the banks of the Mekong. The company was granted 3,000 of these hectares as a duty-free zone, now the SEZ.

Gallery

References

Bokeo province
Laos–Thailand border crossings